Théodore Poussin is a Franco-Belgian comics book series created by the French writer Frank Le Gall.

References

Further reading 

Bandes dessinées